Samuel (pre-reform orthography: Սամուէլ) is an 1886 Armenian-language historical novel by the novelist Raffi. Considered by some critics his most successful work, the plot centres on the killing of the fourth-century Prince Vahan Mamikonian and his wife by their son Samuel. It was first published in the Tiflis newspaper Ardzagankʻ in 1886 and released as a separate edition in 1888. The book is required reading for schoolchildren in Armenia.

Translations
French: Samuel, Jean-Jacques Avédissian, Editions Thaddée (2010), 480 pages

References

1886 novels
Novels by Raffi
Novels set in Armenia
Novels set in the 4th century
Armenian-language novels
Cultural depictions of military officers
Cultural depictions of Armenian men